The Continental Oil Company Filling Station at 35 First Ave. N. in Kalispell, Montana was a historic filling station built around 1932 for the Continental Oil Company which was listed on the National Register of Historic Places in 1994.  It has since been demolished.

Kalispel historically had a variety of gas stations;  according to a 1993 area survey "The service stations that still exist vary greatly in style, from simple brick structures to an Art Deco-style building to one designed to look like a Tudor-style residence."

Architecture 
This station at 35 First Ave is the Tudor-style one.  It was deemed to be "an excellent example of a domestic-style filling station popular in the 1920s and 1930s, and it is the only example of this type in Kalispell. The Tudor-style building has a brick veneer and a steeply pitched gabled roof covered with wood shingles. The lower ends of the roof are slightly flared. Part of the south elevation has been sided in diagonal wood siding, covering two garage bays. The windows are six- and twelve-light metal units, with some picture windows, with brick sills and lintels. The windows in the gable ends are very narrow. The entry on the south has half-timbering below the window and decorative patterned bricks. The floor of the building is concrete throughout, and the walls are also concrete. The door on the west has vertical wide boards and iron strap hinges. Above the door on the south, now the main entrance, one can still see the outline where the letters CONOCO used to be mounted. The building probably represents a corporate design of the period; several visitors to the building have commented that the design is identical to other filling stations they have seen. The concrete construction, however, indicates that it probably was not prefabricated and shipped to Kalispell."

See also 
 Continental Oil Company Building: NRHP-listed Conoco bulk storage complex in Cheyenne, Wyoming
 Jackson Conoco Service Station: NRHP-listed Conoco gas station in El Reno, Oklahoma
 Hughes Conoco Service Station: NRHP-listed Conoco gas station in Topeka, Kansas
 Huning Highlands Conoco Service Station: NRHP-listed Conoco gas station in Albuquerque, New Mexico
 Rainbow Conoco: NRHP-listed Conoco gas station in Shelby, Montana
 Spraker Service Station: NRHP-listed Conoco gas station in Vinita, Oklahoma

References

Gas stations on the National Register of Historic Places in Montana
National Register of Historic Places in Flathead County, Montana
Tudor Revival architecture in Montana
Buildings and structures completed in 1932
Demolished buildings and structures in Montana
Kalispell, Montana
ConocoPhillips